Alina Habba (born March 25, 1984) is an American lawyer and Managing Partner of Habba Madaio & Associates LLP, a legal firm based in Bedminster, New Jersey and offices in New York, New York. She 
is well known for representing former President of the United States, Donald Trump. She is also a Senior Advisor for MAGA, Inc.

Early life and education
Habba, along with her two siblings, was born in Summit, New Jersey to parents who immigrated from Iraq to escape persecution of Catholic Arabs in the early 1980s. Her father, Saad F. Habba, is a gastroenterologist.

Habba graduated from Kent Place School in 2002, and attended Lehigh University, graduating in 2005 with a bachelor's degree in political science. She obtained a J.D. from the Widener University Commonwealth Law School in 2010. Between 2005 and 2007, Habba worked in the fashion industry, working in accessories production and marketing with executives at Marc Jacobs. According to her, although she enjoyed the fashion industry, she decided to attend law school for financial reasons.

Law career
After finishing law school, Habba served as a law clerk to Eugene J. Codey, Jr., then Presiding Judge of the Civil Superior Court in Essex County, New Jersey from September 2010 until in September 2011. Habba began private practice in September 2011, when she joined as an associate at Tompkins, McGuire, Wachenfeld & Barry, LLP, where she worked from September 2011 to February 2013. From February 2013 to March 2020, she was an equity partner and the Managing Partner of Sandelands Eyet LLP, a mid-sized firm that serviced a Fortress subsidiary.  After her 7-year tenure at the firm, she left to start her own company in March 2020. Her firm Habba, Madaio and Associates LLP employs five people. Along with the New Jersey office, Habba has an office in Manhattan.

Habba is a member of the Bar Associations of New Jersey, New York, and the American Bar Association. She is licensed to practice law in New York, New Jersey, Connecticut. She has served as lead counsel for many cases, including a federal class action suit against a New Jersey nursing home accused of various negligent acts and consumer fraud violations.

Habba has also held the position of general counsel for a large parking management and real estate investment firm. She has represented clients in various legal cases including a man suing a nursing home in New Jersey, a student seeking a refund for tuition after University of Bridgeport moved classes to an online format.

In July 2021, Habba represented Siggy Flicker, former star of The Real Housewives of New Jersey who alleged that Facebook had disabled her account for wishing Melania Trump a happy birthday.

In July 2021, Habba represented Caesar DePaço, a pharmaceutical entrepreneur, in a federal court case where he filed a lawsuit against Portuguese journalists for revealing his close connections to the far-right Chega party in Portugal.

Work as Trump attorney
In 2019, Habba joined the Trump National Golf Club Bedminster in New Jersey, an eight-minute drive from her law firm. There, she and Donald Trump got acquainted. Habba had never done legal work for Trump when, in September 2021, he hired her as part of his legal team, replacing several well-established lawyers who had worked for Trump for many years but had withdrawn their services, including: Marc Kasowitz, Charles Harder, Marc Mukasey, Jay Sekulow, and Lawrence S. Rosen. 

Quickly after her hiring, Habba made headlines by filing a $100 million lawsuit on Trump's behalf against the New York Times, three Times reporters, and Trump's niece, Mary L. Trump. Habba also worked on Trump's behalf when he was sued for defamation by Summer Zervos. Trump had called Zervos a "liar" in 2017, after she accused him of kissing her and groping her, without her consent, when she was a contestant on Trump's reality TV show, The Apprentice. In October 2021, Habba filed Trump's countersuit against Zervos, claiming she was trying to stifle Trump's right to free speech. Shortly thereafter, in November 2021, Zervos dismissed the lawsuit.  

Habba represented Trump in a legal case where he was being investigated for falsely representing the value of his assets on his New York State income tax returns. She attempted to appeal a court order requiring Trump and his children to give sworn testimony about the valuations they signed for when filing those returns, but her appeals were unsuccessful. New York's Attorney General, Letitia James, personally questioned Trump on August 10, 2022. Habba was present during the deposition and led the defense. Trump refused to answer any questions during the four-hour deposition by citing the United States Constitution's Fifth Amendment over 450 times.

In February 2022, Habba attempted to prevent Trump from being required to give a sworn statement in an investigation led by New York Attorney General James, but was unsuccessful. In April 2022, a judge found Trump in contempt for failing to comply with a subpoena issued by James for his records. The judge questioned the diligence of the search for records. In May 2022, Judge Arthur F. Engoron of the New York County Supreme Court held Trump in contempt of court and ordered him to pay a $110,000 fine. Trump paid the fine in May 2022, and the ruling remains pending on appeal. 

On July 19, 2022, Habba was sued by a former employee Na'Syia Drayton who claimed Habba repeatedly sang inappropriate gangster rap and hip hop music in the office while using the N word and made racist comment and allegedly referred to New York’s attorney general Letitia James as '"that Black bitch." The lawsuit was settled out of court in September 2022. Habba had called James a "sick person" in January of the same year.

In September 2022,  U.S. District Court Judge Donald M. Middlebrooks dismissed a 2022 suit brought by Habba and Trump against Hillary Clinton, John Podesta, Jake Sullivan, Debbie Wasserman Schultz, and numerous other public officials, private citizens, and private entities that Trump sought damages against for alleged conduct surrounding the 2016 presidential election. Dismissing all of Trump's claims, Middlebrooks concluded that Trump's complaint was not just inadequate in any respect but was inadequate in all respects and expressly reserved the right to consider sanctions against Trump's attorneys at a later date.

Two months after issuing that decision, Middlebrooks sanctioned the Trump lawyers, including Habba, Michael T. Madaio, Peter Ticktin and Jamie Alan Sasson, were assessed $50,000 penalties, plus $16,000 to cover the legal fees paid by one of the defendants. Later in In January 2023, he ordered Habba Madaio & Associates, and Trump to pay $938,000 in legal costs for 31 defendants, including the Democratic National Committee, Hillary Clinton, and former FBI director James Comey. This Order currently pending appeal before the United States Court of Appeals for the Eleventh Circuit.

Habba also represented Trump in a federal civil lawsuit filed by his former attorney, Michael Cohen. Habba filed a motion to dismiss the lawsuit with prejudice, which was granted by the Hon. Lewis J. Liman in his Opinion and Order dated November 14, 2022, successfully dismissing the action in its entirety.

Habba also defended Trump's private interests in the Carroll v. Trump case, when she argued before the U.S. Court of Appeals for the Second Circuit that the Federal Tort Claims Act applies to a former U.S. president. The Second Circuit, in a decision dated September 27, 2022, agreed that Trump was an employee of the United States at the time and that the District Court must consider the applicability of the Federal Tort Claims Act to Trump's comments in that light. The Second Circuit decision did not address the merits of Trump's claim that the comments constituted executive action as the President of the United States.

Media
Alina Habba frequently appears on conservative US media outlets, including Fox News and Newsmax, as well as appearances on radio and podcasts.

Personal life
Habba is an Arab American Catholic who has described herself as "very religious".

Habba met Matthew T. Eyet in law school and they married on September 10, 2011 in Summit, New Jersey. The couple has two children and live in Bernardsville, New Jersey.

See also
 New York investigations of The Trump Organization
 Legal teams involved in the Mueller special counsel investigation

References

External links
 

1984 births
Living people
21st-century American women lawyers
21st-century American lawyers
Kent Place School alumni
People from Bernardsville, New Jersey
People from Summit, New Jersey
Donald Trump litigation
New Jersey lawyers
New York (state) lawyers
Lehigh University alumni
Widener University Commonwealth Law School alumni